SMS V188 was a S-138-class large torpedo boat of the Imperial German Navy. She was built by the AG Vulcan shipyard at Stettin between 1910 and 1911 and launched on 8 February 1911.

V188 took part the First World War. She was present at the Battle of Heligoland Bight in August 1914 and was sunk by the British submarine  on 26 July 1915.

Construction and design
The Imperial German Navy ordered 12 large torpedo boats (Große Torpedoboote) as part of the fiscal year 1910 shipbuilding programme, with one half-flotilla of six ships (V186–V191) ordered from AG Vulcan and the other six ships from Germaniawerft. The two groups of torpedo boats were of basically similar layout but differed slightly in detailed design, with a gradual evolution of design and increase in displacement with each year's orders.

The ship was armed with two 8.8 cm L/45 guns, one on the Forecastle and one aft. Four single 50 cm (19.7 in) torpedo tubes were fitted, with two on the ship's beam in the gap between the forecastle and the ship's bridge which were capable of firing straight ahead, one between the ship's two funnels, and one aft of the funnels. The ship had a crew of 84 officers and men.

V188 was laid down at AG Vulcan's Stettin shipyard as Yard number 306 and was launched on 8 February 1911 and completed on 20 May 1911.

Service

First World War

On 28 August 1914, the  British Harwich Force, supported by light cruisers and battlecruisers of the Grand Fleet, carried out  a raid towards Heligoland with the intention of destroying patrolling German torpedo boats. Four German light cruisers and another flotilla of torpedo boats (V Torpedo Boat Flotilla) was in the vicinity of Heligoland. V188 , a member of the 1st Half Flotilla of I Torpedo Boat Flotilla, formed part of the outer screen of torpedo boats. At about 06:00 on 28 August, another member of the outer screen reported spotting the periscope of a submarine. As a result, the 5th Torpedo Boat Flotilla was ordered out to hunt the hostile submarine. At 07:57 G194 was fired on by British warships, and was soon retreating towards Heligoland, pursued by four British destroyers. On receiving a radio signal from G194 that she was being chased by superior forces, V188 set course at full speed towards Heligoland.

On the evening of 12 April 1915, the German airship L7 sighted a British light cruiser and five surfaced submarines in the Heligoland Bight. I Flotilla was ordered out to attack the submarines,  but V188,  and  collided in thick fog, disabling the three ships and causing the sortie to be aborted. On 26 July 1915, the 2nd Half-flotilla of I Flotilla, including V188 was escorting minesweepers when the British submarine  spotted the torpedo boats and torpedoed V188, blowing off the torpedo boat's stern and sinking her. Two of V188s crew were killed.

References

Torpedo boats of the Imperial German Navy
World War I torpedo boats of Germany
Ships built in Stettin
1911 ships